Pacorus is a male given name of Middle Iranian origin notably born by Parthians. 

People bearing the name include:
 Pacorus I of Parthia (died 38 BC), possibly co-regent with his father Orodes II
 Pacorus II of Parthia, King of Parthia c.78–105
 Pacorus of Armenia (Bakur), a 2nd-century king of Armenia
 Pakor I, king of Persis
 Pacorus of the Lazi, King of the Lazi appointed by Antoninus Pius
 Pacorus of Media Atropatene

See also
Pacores
Bacurius (disambiguation)
Pacurius